The Jukebox Queen of Malta is the second novel by American author Nicholas Rinaldi, first published in 1999 by Bantam Press.

Plot introduction
It concerns Rocco Raven, an American radio operator posted to Malta to join a small intelligence unit during the Siege of Malta working closely with the British RAF who are defending the Island. Central to the novel is Rocco's affair with Melita, a Maltese woman who travels the island repairing jukeboxes.  The story tells how the Maltese people and the military defence of the island react to the increasing privations caused by the siege, and the destruction caused by the German bombing raids...

Film adaptation
According to The New York Times a film adaptation is in development.

References

External links
Chapter One online

1999 American novels
Novels set during World War II
Novels set in Malta
Malta in World War II
Fictional Maltese people
Bantam Press books